The 2012 Continental Indoor Football League season was the Continental Indoor Football League's seventh overall season. The regular season started on Saturday March 10, with the expansion Port Huron Patriots defeating the expansion Chicago Vipers 52–49 at McMorran Arena, and ended with the 2012 CIFL Championship Game, the league's championship game, on June 2, 2012, at the Dow Event Center in Saginaw, Michigan where the Saginaw Sting defeated the Dayton Silverbacks 35–7.

Schedule
For the first time in the past 3 years, the league's schedule was unbalanced. Teams had been playing each team twice for a total for ten games, but in 2012 some teams will play one team 3 times, and another team just once.

Highlights of the 2012 schedule are a home and home battle for the Michigan Cup between the Patriots and Saginaw Sting. Those games will take place on April 14 in Port Huron and April 20 in Saginaw. The Indianapolis Enforcers and Evansville Rage will have a similar challenge as they meet three times during the season, March 17 and April 21 in Evansville and Mother's Day weekend on May 12 in Indianapolis.

The top four teams were supposed to qualify for the playoffs, which were to begin on the weekend of May 26. The playoff format would have #1 hosting #4 and #2 hosting #3. The 2012 CIFL Championship Game will be held on June 2. The playoffs could start on June 2 if voted on by the owners prior to the season in order to miss Memorial Day weekend. But, the league decided to shorten the playoffs. This left the Port Huron Patriots and the Evansville Rage both out of the playoffs, and Dayton and Saginaw into the CIFL Championship Game

Scheduling changes
The following regular season games were moved either by way of ownership change:

 Week 5: The Pythons–Sting game was canceled due to the Pythons ownership change midseason. The game was postposted and rescheduled, only to be played if the game would have playoff implications. The game later proved to have no playoff implications.
 Week 11: the Sting-Rage game was canceled due to the Sting already making the playoffs and not wanting to play the game. The Pythons instead chose to play the Rage in Week 11.

Regular season standings

y - clinched regular-season title

x - clinched playoff spot

Playoffs

Rule changes
There were not major rule changes, but the game ball was changed from the golden color they have used since 2009. The new ball returns to a traditional brown color that can be seen in the NFL, as well as white stripes are painted on each end of the ball, halfway around the circumference, to improve indoor visibility.

Media
The CIFL continues to offer live stats and streaming audio for its games using the Gamecenter on www.CIFLFootball.com, but individual teams are still allowed to contract out their radio and TV broadcasts to local media stations.

The following is a list of media outlets that were used by their respective teams throughout the season:

Coaching changes

Pre-season

In-season

Records and milestones
Most interceptions in a game by a single team: 7, Dayton (vs. Indianapolis, March 11, 2012)
Most interceptions thrown in a game by a single player: 7, Anthony Duckett (Indianapolis, March 11, 2012)
Most points scored in a game by a single team: 91, Saginaw (vs. Indianapolis, March 25, 2012)

Awards

References